Moon Maiden may refer to:

Moon Maiden (character), DC Comics superhero
The Moon Maiden, a 1978 novel by Garrett P. Serviss
The Moon Maiden, an opera by Rutland Boughton
Moon Maiden, a 1679 depiction of and nickname for the lunar mountain Promontorium Heraclides

See also
Moon Maid (disambiguation)
List of lunar deities